Francesco "Frank" Zito (February 24, 1893 – August 22, 1974) was a Sicilian-American mobster who controlled criminal activities in Central and Southern Illinois for over twenty years, providing protection from law enforcement and rival competitors from his base of operations in Springfield, Illinois. It can be debated if Zito was head of his own crime family or, he may have been a powerful capo of the Chicago Outfit with his own crew based in Central Illinois. This information is unclear and it seems as though the files on Mr. Zito lack the investigatory evidence that he was in fact the "Godfather of the Prairie." In any case, Zito was a very powerful force in Springfield and the Central and Southern areas of Illinois.

Born in San Giuseppe, Sicily, Zito immigrated with his family to Illinois. During Prohibition, Zito became involved in bootlegging, prostitution, and illegal gambling. During this period, Zito was convicted of violating federal liquor laws. Based in Springfield, Illinois, Zito and the St. Louis crime syndicate ran illegal gambling and drug trafficking operations in rural Illinois. While attending the 1957 Apalachin Conference in Apalachin, New York, Zito was captured with numerous other mobsters when the New York State Police raided the meeting. Although indicted in a federal investigation into organized crime in the Midwest, Zito remained in power into the 1970s.

On August 22, 1974, Frank Zito died of natural causes

Further reading
Capeci, Jerry. The Complete Idiot's Guide to the Mafia. Indianapolis: Alpha Books, 2002. 
United States. Congress. Senate. Select Committee on Improper Activities in the Labor or Management Field Publication. Investigation of Improper Activities in the Labor Or Management Field, 1959. 
United States. Congress. Senate. Commerce. Effects of organized criminal activity on interstate and foreign commerce. 1972. 
United States. Congress. Senate. Committee on Governmental Affairs. Permanent Subcommittee on Investigations. Organized Crime and Use of Violence: hearings before the Permanent Subcommittee on Investigations. 1980. 
United States. Congress. Senate. Committee on Governmental Affairs. Permanent Subcommittee on Investigations. Organized Crime. For sale by the Supt. of Docs., Congressional Sales Office, U.S. G.P.O., 1988.

References 
Kelly, Robert J. Encyclopedia of Organized Crime in the United States. Westport, Connecticut: Greenwood Press, 2000.

External links
Sangamon County Historical Society
They're not goodfellas. For the Sins of My Father: A Mafia Killer, His Son, and the Legacy of a Mob Life, a book review by Michael O. Garvey
Attendee Profiles At The 1957 Apalachin Mob Confab By Mike La Sorte
Findagrave.com Entry

1893 births
1974 deaths
American crime bosses
American gangsters of Sicilian descent
Prohibition-era gangsters
People from Springfield, Illinois
Italian emigrants to the United States